Dragan Tadić (born 4 February 1977) is a Serbian football forward.

External links
 Dragan Tadić Profile at jelenfootball.com
 
 Dragan Tadić stats at footballzz.co.uk

1977 births
Living people
People from Trstenik, Serbia
Association football forwards
Serbian footballers
FK Napredak Kruševac players
FK Smederevo players
OFK Mladenovac players
FK Sloga Kraljevo players
Serbian SuperLiga players